BS24 may refer to:
BS24, a BS postcode area for Bristol, England
Bonomi BS.24 Biposto Roma, a glider
BS 24 Specifications for Material used in the Construction of Standards for Railway Rolling Stock, a British Standard